Brian Fernández (born 26 September 1994) is an Argentine professional footballer who plays as a forward for Colón.

Club career

Defensa y Justicia 
Fernández made his professional debut for Defensa y Justicia on 25 May 2012 in a 1–0 loss to Ferro Carril Oeste. He participated in three matches but did not score a goal. In the following season Fernández participated in 13 matches, still without scoring.

In the 2013–14 season he secured a position as a starter and scored 11 goals including the goal that secured promotion for his club to the Primera División, against San Martín de San Juan on 15 May 2014. On 8 August 2014 he scored his first goal in the Argentine top division in a 3–1 loss to Racing Club.

Racing Club 
On 31 December 2014 Fernández was signed by Racing Club for a reported $1 million in exchange for 50% of his economic rights. His first goal for the club was in the Copa Libertadores group stage against Sporting Cristal on 10 March 2015. He scored three goals in the competition before his club was eliminated by Guaraní in the quarter-finals. Fernández scored both goals in a 2–0 victory for Racing in his debut in the 2014–15 Copa Argentina against Independiente de Neuquén.

After the 12th round of the 2015 Argentine Primera División Fernández tested positive for prohibited controlled substances and was subsequently prohibited from playing professional football until 9 January 2017. Fernández played the entire 2016 season for Racing Club's reserve team in the reserve league.

After a slow return to Racing's professional squad in 2017, manager Diego Cocca had Fernández loaned out to Primera División side Sarmiento in May. For the club, he scored three goals in his first three matches. He played five of six remaining league matches for Sarmiento, who were relegated at the end of the season.

Fernández was recalled to Racing Club after his loan. He scored against Independiente Medellín in the second round of the 2017 Copa Sudamericana on 27 June 2017.

FC Metz 
On 23 August 2017, Fernández joined Ligue 1 side FC Metz on a one-year loan deal. Metz secured an option to sign him permanently. He made seven substitute appearances for the senior squad without scoring before being moved the reserve squad in the Championnat National 3 (fifth division) for the remainder of the 2017 calendar year. In January 2018 his loan deal was terminated.

Unión La Calera 
On 4 January 2018, Fernández was loaned from Racing Club to newly-promoted Chilean Primera División club Unión La Calera with an option to buy. The 23 year-old scored 11 goals in 12 league matches for Unión La Calera, helping to deliver one of the best seasons in the club's history. His final match for the club was on 29 May against Colo-Colo, in which he scored in the 2–0 victory. Unión La Calera were 3rd place in the league at the time of Fernández's departure to Mexico.

Club Necaxa 
On 7 June 2018, Liga MX club Necaxa confirmed the signing of Fernández on a three-year contract from Racing for a reported $3 million. Fernández scored in his Necaxa debut in a 2–1 victory against Club América in the first round of the 2018–19 Apertura season. He scored four goals in 15 Torneo Apertura appearances, and twelve goals in 15 Torneo Clausura appearances, as well as two goals in two Copa MX appearances, both scored as a substitute in a 3–2 loss to Atlético San Luis. Necaxa qualified for the Clausura Liguilla playoffs, but Fernández did not participate because a transfer agreement for him had been reached.

Portland Timbers 
On 6 May 2019, it was announced that Fernández had signed for Major League Soccer side Portland Timbers as a Designated Player for an undisclosed fee reported to be between $10 and $12 million, a Portland Timbers record. Fernández netted one goal in his debut against the Houston Dynamo on 16 May, and scored eight goals in his first six matches for the Timbers.

On 7 October 2019, it was announced that Fernández has voluntarily entered MLS' Substance Abuse and Behavioral Health Program. On 15 November 2019, Major League Soccer announced they had terminated his contract.

Colón
Following his dismissal by Portland, Fernández moved back to his native Argentina, joining Argentine Primera División side Colón on 10 January 2020.

Shortly after signing with Colón, Fernández reportedly disappeared and failed to arrive for training for three days. His disappearance was reported to the police, who issued an order for whereabouts, and he was later found alive and well at home. Various reasons for his absence were given, including "a flu" and later of a "personal problem".

On 4 February, Fernández was again to miss training amid reports of a robbery where "...they pointed a gun at my [his] head". They also allegedly stole his Rolex watch and threw a brick through his window. He was also reportedly threatened by his own father, due to his father supporting Colón's local rivals Unión de Santa Fe.

Loan spells
Fernández joined Ferro Carril Oeste in late February 2021 on a loan deal for the rest of the year.

In February 2022, he was sent out on loan to Deportivo Madryn until the end of 2022. However, the spell at Deportivo Madryn was cut short and he instead returned to Ferro Carril Oeste on a loan deal until the end of the year. On September 8, 2022, Ferro announced that Fernandez had not shown up for training for two consecutive days and that he "would not be returning again."

Personal life
Fernández has four footballing brothers: Leandro Fernández, Nicolás Fernández, Juan Cruz Villagra and Tomás Villagra; the latter two took their mother's surname.

Doping case
Fernández tested positive for cocaine at two in-competition controls in May 2015, and was subsequently handed a three-month ban from sports by AFA, with the ban ending 3 September 2015. The South American Football Confederation (CONMEBOL) did however seek a two-year ban for him, and he was still suspended in late September 2015. On 28 October it was announced that he had been banned for two years. The substance he had tested positive for was cocaine.

Due to all of those positive drug results, he was moved to Racing Club's reserve team in 2016.

Career statistics

Club

References

External links
 

Living people
1994 births
Association football forwards
Argentine footballers
Argentine expatriate footballers
Argentine Primera División players
Primera Nacional players
Ligue 1 players
Chilean Primera División players
Liga MX players
Major League Soccer players
Defensa y Justicia footballers
Racing Club de Avellaneda footballers
Club Atlético Sarmiento footballers
Unión La Calera footballers
FC Metz players
Club Necaxa footballers
Portland Timbers players
Club Atlético Colón footballers
Ferro Carril Oeste footballers
Deportivo Madryn players
Designated Players (MLS)
Doping cases in association football
Argentine sportspeople in doping cases
Fernández/Villagra family
Argentine expatriate sportspeople in Mexico
Argentine expatriate sportspeople in Chile
Argentine expatriate sportspeople in France
Argentine expatriate sportspeople in the United States
Expatriate footballers in Mexico
Expatriate footballers in Chile
Expatriate footballers in France
Expatriate soccer players in the United States
Footballers from Santa Fe, Argentina